The Legends of Skyfall was a series of four adventure gamebooks written by David Tant and published by Armada in 1985.

The books allow the reader to become a lone adventurer on a planet called Skyfall which was colonized by humans who were fugitives from a dying planet. Although the population of humans on the planet has grown over an undisclosed period of time (hinted at being a few hundred years) to the point where they now outnumber indigenous races, the planet remains largely untamed. The humans themselves are largely hemmed in to a small Kingdom known as Delta.

The series' major deviation from others of the genre was a unique system for organizing combat. Whereas most gamebooks and Role-Playing Games involve the use of dice to create randomness, the Skyfall series adopted a system of coin tosses.

Books
Monsters of the Marsh
The Black Pyramid
Mine of Torments
The Garden of Madness

See also
Choose Your Own Adventure
Fighting Fantasy, Advanced Fighting Fantasy
Lone Wolf
Way of the Tiger

External links
Legends of Skyfall - Series review at Gamebooks.org

Gamebooks
Series of books
Fantasy gamebooks

it:Librogame EL#Skyfall